Fudbalski klub Željezničar Doboj (Serbian Cyrillic: Фудбалски клуб Жeљeзничap Дoбoj) is a football club based in Doboj, Republika Srpska, Bosnia and Herzegovina.  meaning "railwayman" is a common name for sports clubs associated with railway workers.

Coaching history
 Ferko Salihović
 Zlatko Spasojević
 Vladimir Šuvak
 Danko Mišić
 Dragan Đurđević
 Slavko Petrović
 Arnes Handžić
 Milan Draganović 
 Slobodan Ostojić 
 Dragan Đurđević

Presidential history
 Novo Panić
 Dragoljub Nakić
 Murvet Bajraktarević
 Predrag Jevtić
 Savo Mihajlović

External links
 https://web.archive.org/web/20160427062309/http://fkzeljeznicar.info/

Football clubs in Bosnia and Herzegovina
Football clubs in Republika Srpska
Association football clubs established in 1933
1933 establishments in Bosnia and Herzegovina
Doboj